Elections were held in the Australian state of Queensland on 28 May 1960 to elect the 78 members of the state's Legislative Assembly. The election followed the enactment of the Electoral Districts Act 1958 which increased the Assembly from 75 to 78 seats and modified the zonal system first established by Labor ahead of the 1950 election.

The major parties contesting the election were the Country Party led by Premier Frank Nicklin, the Liberal Party led by Kenneth Morris, the Labor Party led by Jack Duggan and the Queensland Labor Party led by Vince Gair. The Country and Liberal parties had formed a coalition.

The Country-Liberal coalition won a second term in office at the election, although the Labor Party recovered 5 seats and 11% of its vote from the 1957 election. Still, it was the first time since 1912 that a non-Labor government had been re-elected in Queensland.

Key dates

Results

|}

 831,398 electors were enrolled to vote at the election, but two Country seats representing 17,814 enrolled voters were unopposed.

Seats changing party representation

There was an extensive redistribution across Queensland prior to this election, increasing the amount of seats from 75 to 78. The seat changes are as follows.

Abolished seats

 Members listed in italics retired at this election.

New seats

Seats changing hands

 Members listed in italics did not recontest their seats.

See also
 Members of the Queensland Legislative Assembly, 1957–1960
 Members of the Queensland Legislative Assembly, 1960–1963
 Candidates of the Queensland state election, 1960
 Nicklin Ministry

Notes

References

Elections in Queensland
1960 elections in Australia
1960s in Queensland
May 1960 events in Australia